Ciudad Jardín El Libertador is a town in General San Martín Partido of Buenos Aires Province, Argentina. It is located in the Greater Buenos Aires area.

Population
With 61,780 inhabitants in 2001 , the town is the most populous in the General San Martín Partido.

External links

Populated places in Buenos Aires Province
General San Martín Partido
Cities in Argentina